The 2019 Lingshui China Masters was a badminton tournament which took place at Agile Stadium in China from 12 to 17 March 2019 and had a total purse of $75,000.

Tournament
The 2019 Lingshui China Masters was the first Super 100 tournament of the 2019 BWF World Tour and also part of the Lingshui China Masters championships, which had been held since 2001. This tournament was organized by the Chinese Badminton Association and sanctioned by the BWF.

Venue
This international tournament was held at Agile Stadium which located inside the Lingshui Culture and Sports Square in Lingshui, Hainan, China.

Point distribution
Below is the point distribution for each phase of the tournament based on the BWF points system for the BWF Tour Super 100 event.

Prize money
The total prize money for this tournament was US$75,000. Distribution of prize money was in accordance with BWF regulations.

Men's singles

Seeds

 Ihsan Maulana Mustofa (third round)
 Zhao Junpeng (second round)
 Chong Wei Feng (second round)
 Zhou Zeqi (quarter-finals)
 Shesar Hiren Rhustavito (second round)
 Firman Abdul Kholik (second round)
 Chico Aura Dwi Wardoyo (second round)
 Sony Dwi Kuncoro (withdrew)

Finals

Top half

Section 1

Section 2

Bottom half

Section 3

Section 4

Women's singles

Seeds

 Zhang Yiman (final)
 Kim Ga-eun (champion)
 Chiang Ying-li (first round)
 Kim Hyo-min (semi-finals)
 Chananchida Jucharoen (first round)
 Jeon Ju-i (quarter-finals)
 Chen Su-yu (first round)
 Lin Ying-chun (first round)

Finals

Top half

Section 1

Section 2

Bottom half

Section 3

Section 4

Men's doubles

Seeds

 Ou Xuanyi / Ren Xiangyu (final)
 Akbar Bintang Cahyono / Muhammad Reza Pahlevi Isfahani (withdrew)
 Frengky Wijaya Putra / Sabar Karyaman Gutama (quarter-finals)
 Chooi Kah Ming / Low Juan Shen (quarter-finals)
 Di Zijian / Wang Chang (semi-finals)
 Huang Kaixiang / Wang Zekang (semi-finals)
 Lin Shang-kai / Tseng Min-hao (second round)
 Choi Hyuk-gyun / Kim Jae-hwan (first round)

Finals

Top half

Section 1

Section 2

Bottom half

Section 3

Section 4

Women's doubles

Seeds

 Dong Wenjing / Feng Xueying (second round)
 Citra Putri Sari Dewi / Jin Yujia (first round)
 Febriana Dwipuji Kusuma / Ribka Sugiarto (second round)
 Baek Ha-na / Kim Hye-rin (champions)
 Cao Tongwei / Yu Xiaohan (quarter-finals)
 Chung Kan-yu / Lin Xiao-min (first round)
 Liu Xuanxuan / Xia Yuting (final)
 Virni Putri / Vania Arianti Sukoco (second round)

Finals

Top half

Section 1

Section 2

Bottom half

Section 3

Section 4

Mixed doubles

Seeds

 Hoo Pang Ron / Cheah Yee See (second round)
 Ou Xuanyi / Feng Xueying (quarter-finals)
 Ren Xiangyu / Zhou Chaomin (quarter-finals)
 Zachariah Josiahno Sumanti / Angelica Wiratama (first round)
 Choi Hyuk-gyun / Baek Ha-na (first round)
 Danny Bawa Chrisnanta / Tan Wei Han (semi-finals)
 Chen Sihang / Zhou Shunqi (first round)
 Guo Xinwa / Liu Xuanxuan (final)

Finals

Top half

Section 1

Section 2

Bottom half

Section 3

Section 4

References

External links
 Tournament Link

Lingshui China Masters
Lingshui China Masters
Lingshui China Masters
Lingshui China Masters